Abkhazian cheese, is a cheese found across the Abkhazia and other areas with a Abkhazian diaspora. Abkhazian cheese it belongs to Pasta filata family of cheeses. Generally, sheep's and cow's milk or cow's and buffalo's milk are used.

Sakarya Abkhazian cheese 
It is a cheese made by Abkhazians who settled in Sakarya province 700 years ago. It is a cheese that has similar properties to Kasseri and dil peyniri. Sakarya Abkhazian cheese Cheese was registered by the Turkish Patent and Trademark Office on 03.05.2021 and received geographical indication.

References

Culture of Abkhazia
Turkish cuisine
Cuisine of Georgia (country)